Companionate Marriage was a 1928 American silent drama film directed by Erle C. Kenton and starring Betty Bronson, and released by First National Pictures. The film is now considered lost.

The film was a collaboration between the company of Asher Small Rogers and Sam Sax. It was banned by the New York State Censor.

Cast
 Betty Bronson – Sally Williams
 Alec B. Francis – Judge Meredith
 William Welsh – Mr. Williams
 Edward Martindel – James Moore
 Sarah Padden – Mrs. Williams
 Hedda Hopper – Mrs. Moore
 Richard Walling – Donald Moore
 Arthur Rankin – Tommy Van Cleve
 June Nash – Ruth Moore

References

External links
 
 

1928 films
1928 drama films
Silent American drama films
American silent feature films
American black-and-white films
Films directed by Erle C. Kenton
First National Pictures films
Lost American films
Films produced by Edward Small
1928 lost films
Lost drama films
1920s American films